Vlchek Tool Company was a hand tool manufacturer.  Vlchek originally made and sharpened tools for stonecutters and masons, and later made tools for automobiles and for agriculture machinery.

Vlchek Tool Company was founded as a blacksmith shop in 1894 in Cleveland, Ohio by Frank J. Vlchek. It was incorporated in 1909. 

In 1958 Pendleton Tool Industries Co. bought the Vlchek Tool Company. In 1964  Pendleton itself merged with Ingersoll-Rand.  In 1969 Ingersoll closed Vlchek's plant on East 87th Street in Cleveland.

See also
 List of defunct consumer brands

References

External links
VLCHEK, FRANK J. - The Encyclopedia of Cleveland History
VLCHEK TOOL CO. - The Encyclopedia of Cleveland History

Defunct consumer brands
Defunct manufacturing companies based in Ohio
Tool manufacturing companies of the United States
Automotive tool manufacturers
Manufacturing companies based in Cleveland